Psaphida resumens, commonly named the figure-eight sallow, is a species of moth of the family Noctuidae. It is found from southern Ontario and Massachusetts to Florida, west to Texas, north to Minnesota.

The wingspan is 32–38 mm. Adults are on wing from March to May.

The larvae feed on the leaves of oak and maple.

External links
Images
Bug Guide

Psaphida
Moths of North America
Moths described in 1865